Professor Carlene Firmin  (born 1983 or 1984) is a British social researcher and writer specialising in violence between young people, and founder of the MsUnderstood Partnership. She is a professor of sociology at Durham University.

Early life and education
Firmin attended St Michael's Catholic Grammar School in  Barnet, London. She has a B.A. in philosophy from Fitzwilliam College, University of Cambridge, and an M.Sc. in social policy and planning from the London School of Economics. She has a professional doctorate from the University of Bedfordshire for which her thesis was "Peer on peer abuse: safeguarding implications of contextualising abuse between young people within social fields" (2015).

Career
Firmin was senior policy officer at Race on the Agenda (ROTA), and founded the GAG project (Girls Against Gangs, or Girls Affected by Gangs, or Gendered Action on Gangs). She has held positions of  assistant director of policy and research at Barnardos, specialising in youth justice and sexual exploitation of children; principal policy adviser at the Office of the Children's Commissioner; and head of the secretariat for the Inquiry into Child Sexual Exploitation in Groups and Gangs.

Between 2011 and 2014 she wrote a regular column "Girl in the Corner" in The Guardian.

In 2013 she founded the MsUnderstood Partnership, a joint project between Girls in Gangs, Imkaan and the University of Bedfordshire. The project "aims to improve local and national responses to young people’s experiences of inequality".

Firmin was until 2021 a senior research fellow in the Institute of Applied Research of the Department of Applied Social Studies at the University of Bedfordshire. In September 2021 she became a professor of sociology at Durham University, one of only 40 female black professors in the UK and one of the youngest ever appointed.

Awards
Firmin was awarded an MBE in the 2011 New Year Honours for "services to girls' and women's issues", and was the youngest black woman to have received this honour.

References

External links
 
 Contextual Safeguarding: Re-writing the rules of child protection (TEDx Talk, 2019)

Year of birth missing (living people)
Living people
Alumni of the London School of Economics
Alumni of Fitzwilliam College, Cambridge
Alumni of the University of Bedfordshire
Academics of the University of Bedfordshire
Academics of Durham University
British social scientists
Black British women academics
Members of the Order of the British Empire
Place of birth missing (living people)